Szolnok is a railway station of the Hungarian State Railways (MÁV) in Szolnok, Hungary.

Passin train line(s)
 Hatvan–Szolnok railway (Line 82)
 Vámosgyörk–Újszász–Szolnok railway (Line 86)
 Szolnok–Debrecen–Nyíregyháza–Záhony railway (Line 100)
 Budapest–Cegléd–Szolnok railway (Line 100A)
 Szolnok–Békéscsaba–Lőkösháza railway (Line 120)
 Budapest–Újszász–Szolnok railway (Line 120A)
 Szolnok–Hódmezővásárhely–Makó railway (Line 130)
 Szolnok–Kiskunfélegyháza railway (Line 145)

Transport
 Bus (local): 2Y, 3, 6, 6Y, 7, 7Y, 8, 8Y, 10, 11, 12, 13, 13Y, 15, K15, 16, 17, 21, 24, 24A, 27, 28, 34, 34A, 34E, 38
 Bus (long-distance): 533, 534, 537, 538, 553

Train services
The station is served by the following services:

International services
EuroCity services – EC
(Hortobágy) Debrecen – Szolnok – Budapest – Tatabánya – Győr – Wien Westbf
EuroNight services – EN
(Ister) Bp-Keleti pu. – Szolnok – Békéscsaba – Arad – Deva – Sibiu – Brasov – Ploieşti Vest – București Nord
Int. InterCity services – IC
(Corona, Hargita) Bp-Keleti pu. – Szolnok – Püspökladány – Oradea – Cluj Napoca – Miercurea Ciuc – Brasov
(Körös) Bp-Keleti pu. – Szolnok – Békéscsaba – Arad – Timişoara Nord
(Transsylvania) Bp-Keleti pu. – Szolnok – Békéscsaba – Arad – Deva – Sibiu – Brasov
(Traianus) Bp-Keleti pu. – Szolnok – Békéscsaba – Arad – Timişoara - Drobeta Tr.Severin – Craiova – București Nord
Int. Express services
(Dacia) Wien Westbf – Győr – Tatabánya – Bp-Keleti pu. – Szolnok – Békéscsaba – Arad – Deva – Brasov – București Nord

Domestic services
Intercity services – IC
(Cívis, Hajdú, Holló, Kócsag, Nyírség, Páva, Rétköz, Rigó, Szabolcs, Vércse)Bp-Nyugati pu. – Szolnok – Püspökladány – Hajdúszoboszló – Debrecen – Nyíregyháza
(Bereg-Kraszna, Ung)Bp-Nyugati pu. – Szolnok – Püspökladány – Hajdúszoboszló – Debrecen – Nyíregyháza – Kisvárda – Záhony
(Takta)Bp-Nyugati pu. – Szolnok – Püspökladány – Hajdúszoboszló – Debrecen – Nyíregyháza – Tokaj – Szerencs – Miskolc-Tiszai
(Alföld, Békés, Csanád, Viharsarok)Bp-Keleti pu. – Szolnok – Mezőtúr – Gyoma – Mezőberény – Békéscsaba – Kétegyháza – Lőkösháza

Distance from other railway stations

Hungary
Budapest -Nyugati; -Keleti: 100 km
Békéscsaba: 96 km
Debrecen: 121 km
Hatvan: 68 km
Kiskunfélegyháza: 85 km
Nyíregyháza: 170 km
Siófok (via Budapest): 215 km
Szeged (via Cegléd): 145 km
Szentes: 74 km
Vámosgyörk: 88 km

Europe
Arad: 153 km
București Nord: 754 km
Cluj-Napoca: 299 km
Kyiv-Pasazhyrskyi: 1129 km
München Hbf: 840 km
Praha hl.n: 711 km
Timișoara Nord: 210 km
Wien Hbf: 354 km

Gallery

See also 

History of rail transport in Hungary
Rail transport in Hungary

References

External links 

Szolnok Tourist Office Szolnok city tourist board website.
Szolnok railway station – vasutallomasok.hu 

Buildings and structures in Szolnok
Railway stations in Hungary
Railway stations opened in 1847
Railway stations opened in 1975
Ferenc Pfaff railway stations

Railway stations in Hungary opened in 1847